Alec William Pantaleo (born July 9, 1996) is an American freestyle wrestler and graduated folkstyle wrestler who competes at 70 kilograms. In freestyle, he is the defending US Open National Champion, was the 2021 Pan American Continental champion, claimed the 2021 Matteo Pellicone Ranking Series and the 2021 Poland Open titles, earned silver and bronze medals (2021 and 2018, respectively) from the US Open National Championships and was the 2019 U23 US Team Member. As a folkstyle wrestler, Pantaleo was a three–time NCAA DI All-American and a Big Ten Conference champion out of the University of Michigan.

Folkstyle career

High school 
Born and raised in the state of Michigan, Pantaleo went on to attend Canton High School. During his time as a high schooler, he became a MHSAA state champion as a sophomore and after losing his junior season to an injury, he claimed runner-up honors at the state tournament as a senior, graduating with an 177–9 record and a 51–1 record in his last year.

College 
After his high school career concluded, Pantaleo was recruited by the University of Michigan.

2014-15 
In his freshman year, Pantaleo made his collegiate debut at the Michigan State Open, claiming the title. An unseeded wrestler, he then went on to place second at the prestigious Cliff Keen Memorial Invitational and racked up an 8-4 dual record during regular season. At the Big Ten Conference Championships, he reached the consolation semifinals before being eliminated. At the NCAA's he went 2–2.

2015-16 
As a sophomore Alec went on to achieve All-American honors by place 6th at the NCAA Division I national Championships (March 19–21) at 149 lbs. He pinned Drexel's fourth-seeded Matthew Cimato in 3:48 in the quarterfinal to secure his first All-American honor. A few weeks prior, Alec took third at the B1G conference championship with a 4-1 record. At the conference championships he avenged a earlier season loss to former NCAA national champion Jason Tsirtsis with a 8-4 decision in the third-place bout. He also earned a third-place finish at the Cliff Keen Las Vegas Invitational (Dec 4-5) with a 7-1 record.

2016-17 
Alec redshirted and did not compete in any collegiate wrestling events.

2017-18 
As a Junior Alec went on to achieve All-American honors by place 5th at the NCAA Division I National Championships (March 15–17) at 157 lbs. He captured the B1G conference championship with a 3-0 record. At the conference championship he defeated Ohio State's Micah Jordan with a 3-1 score in the final bout. Earlier in the season he went 5-0 to captured the Cliff Keen Las Vegas Invitational title with a 10-3 win over Micah Jordan in the finals and a 9-3 semi-final win over Nebraskas #4 ranked Tyler Berger.

2018-19 
As a fifth-year Senior Alec once again secured an All-American honor by placing third at the NCAA Division I National Championships. He carried a 6-1 record at his final collegiate competition, as well as avenged his only loss of the tournament to North Carolina State's Hayden Hidlay. Pantaleo lost to Hidlay in the quarterfinals in overtime but best him in the third place bout with a 5-3 decision. Alec took third place at the Big Ten conference championship with a notable 10-4 win over Northwestern's #3 ranked Ryan Deakin in the medal match. Alec missed much of his senior season due to a serious case of Mononucleosis.

Freestyle career 
Alec has garnered many levels of success in freestyle following his first appearance to the international circuit in 2015. Since then, Alec has finished top-eight at every United States Freestyle national-championships and represented the United States overseas in numerous notable sporting events.

2015 
Alec finished with runner up honors at the Junior National Championships in Las Vegas, Nevada. Pantaleo fell to Wyoming's Archie Colgan in the championship bout.

2016 
Alec won the Junior National Championships at 66 kg, beating Princeton's Matthew Kolodzik in the first place-bout. In the weeks following he made the United States Junior World team at 66 kg by beating Kolodzik two more time times in a best-of-three final bout. Pantaleo went on to represent the United States at the Junior World Championships in Macon, France later that summer. While overseas he posted a 1-1 record, defeating Georgi Sulava from Georgia in the opening round, but eventually falling to Viaks Vikas from India in the following preliminary match. Pantaleo finished with a 10th place finish at the 2016 Junior World Championships.

2017 
Pantaleo placed 5th at the USA Senior National Men's Freestyle Championships at 70 kg in Las Vegas, Nevada

2018 
Pantaleo placed 3rd at 70 kg at the 2018 Senior National Men's Freestyle National Championships in Las Vegas, Nevada. He also placed 3rd at the 2018 Senior World Team Trials at 70 kg in Rochester, Minnesota

2019 
Alec won the 70 kg U23 National Championships in Akron, Ohio, and was bestowed the Outstanding Wrestler Award by USA wrestling following a remarkably dominant performance. Pantaleo posted a perfect 7-0 record and outscored his opponents by a margin of 69-2. Additionally, he secured his spot as a 2019 U23 World Team Member. Later that year, Pantaleo finished 8th in the world at the U23 World championships in Budapest, Hungary. In the opening round Pantaleo defeated Stefan Tonu of Moldova by a score of 8-0. He then fell to Daud Ibragimov of Azerbaijan by a score of 9-8. Pantaleo finished with a record of 1-1.

Domestically, Pantaleo also placed 4th at the 70 kg 2019 Senior National Men's Freestyle championships in Las Vegas, Nevada at and 8th at 74 kg in Fort Worth, Texas

2020 
Pantaleo won gold at the Cerro Pelado International in Havana, Cuba with a perfect 5-0 record while representing the United States at 70 kg. In the finals Pantaleo beat former United States national champion/ world team member Reece Humphrey by a score of 7-2.

2021 
Pantaleo earned a 3rd place finish at the inaugural Flowrestling 150 lb 8-man bracket challenge in Austin, Texas. Pantaleo went 2-1 in route to a bronze medal, beating former NCAA national champions Jordan Oliver and Anthony Ashnault. Pantaleo fell to James Green by a score of 4-2 in the semi-finals.

Pantaleo claimed the 70 kg title at the Matteo Pellicone International in Rome, Italy in April 2021. Pantaleo beat 2019 world-finalist Daulet Niyazbekov of Kazakhstan in the opening round and gold medal match with respective scores of 6-2 and 4-0.

Domestically, Alec took 2nd at the 2021 U.S Senior National Championships while competing at 70 kg. Pantaleo fell to James Green in the gold medal bout by a score of 2-7.

In June 2021, Alec Pantaleo won gold at the 2021 Pan American Wrestling Championships in Guatemala City, Guatemala. Pantaleo won all three of his matches by technical superiority, beating Carlos Romero Millaqueo from Chile with a score of 12–0 in the gold medal bout.

Pantaleo also claimed the 2021 Poland Open championship in Warsaw, Poland. Pantaleo defeated James Green in the final bout by a score of 5-3. In his semi-final bout, Pantaleo defeated three-time world champion and Olympic Bronze Medalist Haji Aliyev of Azerbaijan with a score of 6-6.

Pantaleo closed out his 2021 campaign with a medical withdrawal from the 2021 United States World Team Trials (wrestling). In his semi finals bout it is recorded that he sustained a rib related injury, causing for a medical forfeit. At that time of injury, Pantaleo was the top ranked wrestler in the world at 70 kg, according to United World Wrestling.

Freestyle record 

! colspan="7"| Senior Freestyle Matches
|-
!  Res.
!  Record
!  Opponent
!  Score
!  Date
!  Event
!  Location
|-
! style=background:white colspan=7 |
|-
|Loss
|66–24
|align=left| Sammy Sasso
|style="font-size:88%"|6–12
|style="font-size:88%" rowspan=3|May 21–22, 2022
|style="font-size:88%" rowspan=3|2022 US World Team Trials Challenge Tournament
|style="text-align:left;font-size:88%;" rowspan=3|
 Coralville, Iowa
|-
|Loss
|66–23
|align=left| Zain Retherford
|style="font-size:88%"|2–5
|-
|Win
|66–22
|align=left| Tyler Berger
|style="font-size:88%"|3–2
|-
! style=background:white colspan=7 |
|-
|Win
|65–22
|align=left| Jordan Oliver
|style="font-size:88%"|4–2
|style="font-size:88%" rowspan=5|April 27 – May 1, 2022
|style="font-size:88%" rowspan=5|2022 US Open National Championships
|style="text-align:left;font-size:88%;" rowspan=5|
 Las Vegas, Nevada
|-
|Win
|64–22
|align=left| Doug Zapf
|style="font-size:88%"|3–2
|-
|Win
|63–22
|align=left| Ed Scott
|style="font-size:88%"|8–1
|-
|Win
|62–22
|align=left| Riley Gurr
|style="font-size:88%"|TF 14–4
|-
|Win
|61–22
|align=left| Luka Wick
|style="font-size:88%"|18–10
|-
|Win
|60–22
|align=left| Jordan Oliver
|style="font-size:88%"|4–1
|style="font-size:88%"|March 16, 2022
|style="font-size:88%"|Rudis+: Snyder vs. Cox
|style="text-align:left;font-size:88%;"|
 Detroit, Michigan
|-
! style=background:white colspan=7 | 
|-
|Loss
|59–22
|align=left| Alan Kudzoev
|style="font-size:88%"|4–4
|style="font-size:88%"|January 27, 2022
|style="font-size:88%"|Golden Grand Prix Ivan Yarygin 2022
|style="text-align:left;font-size:88%;"|
 Krasnoyarsk, Russia
|-
! style=background:white colspan=7 |
|-
|
|
|align=left| Zain Retherford
|style="font-size:88%"|FF
|style="font-size:88%" rowspan=3|September 11–12, 2021
|style="font-size:88%" rowspan=3|2021 US World Team Trials
|style="text-align:left;font-size:88%;" rowspan=3| Lincoln, Nebraska
|-
|Loss
|59–21
|align=left| Ryan Deakin
|style="font-size:88%"|INJ (4–10)
|-
|Win
|59–20
|align=left| Brayton Lee
|style="font-size:88%"|9–0
|-
! style=background:white colspan=7 |
|-
|Win
|58–20
|align=left| James Green
|style="font-size:88%"|5–3
|style="font-size:88%" rowspan=4|June 8, 2021
|style="font-size:88%" rowspan=4|2021 Poland Open
|style="text-align:left;font-size:88%;" rowspan=4|
 Warsaw, Poland
|-
|Win
|57–20
|align=left| Haji Aliyev
|style="font-size:88%"|6–6
|-
|Loss
|56–20
|align=left| James Green
|style="font-size:88%"|0–8
|-
|Win
|56–19
|align=left| Oleksii Boruta
|style="font-size:88%"|TF 10–0
|-
! style=background:white colspan=7 |
|-
|Win
|55–19
|align=left| Carlos Romero Millaqueo
|style="font-size:88%"|TF 12–0
|style="font-size:88%" rowspan=3|May 30, 2021
|style="font-size:88%" rowspan=3|2021 Pan American Continental Championships
|style="text-align:left;font-size:88%;" rowspan=3| Guatemala City, Guatemala
|-
|Win
|54–19
|align=left| Vincent De Marinis
|style="font-size:88%"|TF 11–0
|-
|Win
|53–19
|align=left| João Victor dos Santos Silva
|style="font-size:88%"|TF 10–0
|-
! style=background:white colspan=7 |
|-
|Loss
|52–19
|align=left| James Green
|style="font-size:88%"|2–7
|style="font-size:88%" rowspan=5|May 1–2, 2021
|style="font-size:88%" rowspan=5|2021 US Open National Championships
|style="text-align:left;font-size:88%;" rowspan=5| Coralville, Iowa
|-
|Win
|52–18
|align=left| Tyler Berger
|style="font-size:88%"|6–2
|-
|Win
|51–18
|align=left| Parker Kropman
|style="font-size:88%"|TF 10–0
|-
|Win
|50–18
|align=left| Ryan Ojeda
|style="font-size:88%"|TF 12–2
|-
|Win
|49–18
|align=left| Zachary Wigzell
|style="font-size:88%"|TF 10–0
|-
! style=background:white colspan=7 |
|-
|Loss
|48–18
|align=left| Tyler Berger
|style="font-size:88%"|6–6
|style="font-size:88%" rowspan=6|March 27, 2021
|style="font-size:88%" rowspan=6|2020 US Last Chance Olympic Team Trials Qualifier
|style="text-align:left;font-size:88%;" rowspan=6|
 Forth Worth, Texas
|-
|Loss
|48–17
|align=left| Chance Marsteller
|style="font-size:88%"|0–7
|-
|Win
|48–16
|align=left| Joshua Shields
|style="font-size:88%"|7–5
|-
|Win
|47–16
|align=left| Carlos Cuevas
|style="font-size:88%"|TF 10–0
|-
|Win
|46–16
|align=left| Ryan Ojeda
|style="font-size:88%"|TF 10–0
|-
|Win
|45–16
|align=left| Sammy Cokeley
|style="font-size:88%"|TF 10–0
|-
! style=background:white colspan=7 |
|-
|Win
|44–16
|align=left| Daulet Niyazbekov
|style="font-size:88%"|4–0
|style="font-size:88%" rowspan=4|March 6, 2021
|style="font-size:88%" rowspan=4|Matteo Pellicone Ranking Series 2021
|style="text-align:left;font-size:88%;" rowspan=4|
 Rome, Italy
|-
|Win
|43–16
|align=left| Vishal Kaliraman
|style="font-size:88%"|TF 10–0
|-
|Win
|42–16
|align=left| Mustafa Kaya
|style="font-size:88%"|FF
|-
|Win
|41–16
|align=left| Daulet Niyazbekov
|style="font-size:88%"|6–2
|-
! style=background:white colspan=7 |
|-
|Win
|40–16
|align=left| Anthony Ashnault
|style="font-size:88%"|8–1
|style="font-size:88%" rowspan=3|December 18, 2020
|style="font-size:88%" rowspan=3|Flo 8-Man Challenge: 150 lbs
|style="text-align:left;font-size:88%;" rowspan=3|
 Austin, Texas
|-
|Loss
|39–16
|align=left| James Green
|style="font-size:88%"|2–4
|-
|Win
|39–15
|align=left| Jordan Oliver
|style="font-size:88%"|4–4
|-
! style=background:white colspan=7 |
|-
|Win
|38–15
|align=left| Matthew Kolodzik
|style="font-size:88%"|8–6
|style="font-size:88%" rowspan=4|December 4–5, 2020
|style="font-size:88%" rowspan=4|FloWrestling RTC Cup
|style="text-align:left;font-size:88%;" rowspan=4| Austin, Texas
|-
|Win
|37–15
|align=left| Tariq Wilson
|style="font-size:88%"|TF 10–0
|-
|Win
|36–15
|align=left| Kevin Jack
|style="font-size:88%"|7–2
|-
|Win
|35–15
|align=left| Brayton Lee
|style="font-size:88%"|TF 10–0
|-
|Loss
|34–15
|align=left| Zain Retherford
|style="font-size:88%"|2–3
|style="font-size:88%"|September 19, 2020
|style="font-size:88%"|NLWC I
|style="text-align:left;font-size:88%;" |
 State College, Pennsylvania
|-
! style=background:white colspan=7 |
|-
|Win
|34–14
|align=left| Reece Humphrey
|style="font-size:88%"|FF
|style="font-size:88%" rowspan=5|February 9–17, 2020
|style="font-size:88%" rowspan=5|2020 Cerro Pelado International
|style="text-align:left;font-size:88%;" rowspan=5|
 Havana, Cuba
|-
|Win
|33–14
|align=left| Orislandy Perdomo
|style="font-size:88%"|9–1
|-
|Win
|32–14
|align=left| Albaro Camacho
|style="font-size:88%"|4–1
|-
|Win
|31–14
|align=left| Julio Cesar Cruz
|style="font-size:88%"|4–2
|-
|Win
|30–14
|align=left| Reece Humphrey
|style="font-size:88%"|7–2
|-
! style=background:white colspan=7 |
|-
|Loss
|29–14
|align=left| Joey Lavallee
|style="font-size:88%"|2–7
|style="font-size:88%" rowspan=6|December 20–22, 2019
|style="font-size:88%" rowspan=6|2019 US Senior National Championships
|style="text-align:left;font-size:88%;" rowspan=6|
 Las Vegas, Nevada
|-
|Loss
|29–13
|align=left| Anthony Valencia
|style="font-size:88%"|TF 0–10
|-
|Win
|29–12
|align=left| Tyler Berger
|style="font-size:88%"|10–2
|-
|Loss
|28–12
|align=left| Nazar Kulchytskyy
|style="font-size:88%"|TF 3–14
|-
|Win
|28–11
|align=left| Muhammed McBryde
|style="font-size:88%"|4–2
|-
|Win
|27–11
|align=left| Shabaka Johns
|style="font-size:88%"|TF 11–1
|-
! style=background:white colspan=7 |
|-
|Loss
|26–11
|align=left| Daud Ibragimov
|style="font-size:88%"|8–9
|style="font-size:88%" rowspan=2|October 28 – November 3, 2019
|style="font-size:88%" rowspan=2|2019 U23 World Championships
|style="text-align:left;font-size:88%;" rowspan=2|
 Budapest, Hungary
|-
|Win
|26–10
|align=left| Stefan Tonu
|style="font-size:88%"|8–0
|-
! style=background:white colspan=7 |
|-
|Win
|25–10
|align=left| Jimmy Hoffman
|style="font-size:88%"|TF 11–0
|style="font-size:88%" rowspan=7|May 31 – June 2, 2019
|style="font-size:88%" rowspan=7|2019 US U23 World Team Trials
|style="text-align:left;font-size:88%;" rowspan=7|
 Akron, Ohio
|-
|Win
|24–10
|align=left| Jimmy Hoffman
|style="font-size:88%"|7–1
|-
|Win
|23–10
|align=left| Mike D'Angelo
|style="font-size:88%"|TF 11–1
|-
|Win
|22–10
|align=left| Samuel Krivus
|style="font-size:88%"|TF 10–0
|-
|Win
|21–10
|align=left| Justin McCoy
|style="font-size:88%"|TF 10–0
|-
|Win
|20–10
|align=left| Kyler Rea
|style="font-size:88%"|TF 10–0
|-
|Win
|19–10
|align=left| Bryce Thurston
|style="font-size:88%"|TF 10–0
|-
! style=background:white colspan=7 |
|-
|Loss
|18–10
|align=left| Brandon Sorensen
|style="font-size:88%"|2–5
|style="font-size:88%" rowspan=3|May 17–19, 2019
|style="font-size:88%" rowspan=3|2019 US World Team Trials Challenge Tournament
|style="text-align:left;font-size:88%;" rowspan=3|
 Rochester, Minnesota
|-
|Win
|18–9
|align=left| Hayden Hidlay
|style="font-size:88%"|8–3
|-
|Loss
|17–9
|align=left| Jason Chamberlain
|style="font-size:88%"|2–3
|-
! style=background:white colspan=7 |
|-
|Loss
|17–8
|align=left| Jason Nolf
|style="font-size:88%"|6–10
|style="font-size:88%" rowspan=7|April 24–27, 2019
|style="font-size:88%" rowspan=7|2019 US Open National Championships
|style="text-align:left;font-size:88%;" rowspan=7|
 Las Vegas, Nevada
|-
|Win
|17–7
|align=left| Nazar Kulchytskyy
|style="font-size:88%"|FF
|-
|Loss
|16–7
|align=left| Ryan Deakin
|style="font-size:88%"|4–8
|-
|Win
|16–6
|align=left| Brandon Sorensen
|style="font-size:88%"|5–3
|-
|Win
|15–6
|align=left| Jarod Verkleeren
|style="font-size:88%"|TF 12–0
|-
|Win
|14–6
|align=left| Chayse Jackson
|style="font-size:88%"|TF 10–0
|-
|Win
|13–6
|align=left| Mitch Finesilver
|style="font-size:88%"|TF 11–1
|-
! style=background:white colspan=7 |
|-
|Win
|12–6
|align=left| Ryan Deakin
|style="font-size:88%"|5–0
|style="font-size:88%" rowspan=4|May 18–20, 2018
|style="font-size:88%" rowspan=4|2018 US World Team Trials Challenge Tournament
|style="text-align:left;font-size:88%;" rowspan=4|
 Rochester, Minnesota
|-
|Win
|11–6
|align=left| Kyle Ruschell
|style="font-size:88%"|FF
|-
|Loss
|10–6
|align=left| Frank Molinaro
|style="font-size:88%"|0–8
|-
|Win
|10–5
|align=left| Griffin Parriott
|style="font-size:88%"|11–3
|-
! style=background:white colspan=7 |
|-
|Win
|9–5
|align=left| Dylan Ness
|style="font-size:88%"|8–2
|style="font-size:88%" rowspan=6|April 24–28, 2018
|style="font-size:88%" rowspan=6|2018 US Open National Championships
|style="text-align:left;font-size:88%;" rowspan=6|
 Las Vegas, Nevada
|-
|Win
|8–5
|align=left| Ryan Deakin
|style="font-size:88%"|13–5
|-
|Loss
|7–5
|align=left| Hayden Hidlay
|style="font-size:88%"|5–7
|-
|Win
|7–4
|align=left| Dylan Ness
|style="font-size:88%"|TF 11–1
|-
|Win
|6–4
|align=left| Mike DePalma
|style="font-size:88%"|TF 10–0
|-
|Win
|5–4
|align=left| Kyle Kintz
|style="font-size:88%"|TF 10–0
|-
! style=background:white colspan=7 |
|-
|Loss
|4–4
|align=left| Dylan Ness
|style="font-size:88%"|6–9
|style="font-size:88%" rowspan=2|June 9–10, 2017
|style="font-size:88%" rowspan=2|2017 US World Team Trials Challenge Tournament
|style="text-align:left;font-size:88%;" rowspan=2|
 Lincoln, Nebraska
|-
|Loss
|4–3
|align=left| Jason Nolf
|style="font-size:88%"|TF 2–13
|-
! style=background:white colspan=7 |
|-
|Win
|4–2
|align=left| Jason Chamberlain
|style="font-size:88%"|5–1
|style="font-size:88%" rowspan=6|April 26–29, 2017
|style="font-size:88%" rowspan=6|2017 US Open National Championships
|style="text-align:left;font-size:88%;" rowspan=6|
 Las Vegas, Nevada
|-
|Loss
|3–2
|align=left| Steven Pami
|style="font-size:88%"|9–10
|-
|Loss
|3–1
|align=left| Nazar Kulchytskyy
|style="font-size:88%"|TF 0–10
|-
|Win
|3–0
|align=left| Jason Chamberlain
|style="font-size:88%"|8–6
|-
|Win
|2–0
|align=left| Robbie Mathers
|style="font-size:88%"|8–1
|-
|Win
|1–0
|align=left| Jason Welch
|style="font-size:88%"|TF 13–3
|-

References 

1996 births
Living people
Michigan Wolverines wrestlers
People from Canton, Michigan
Sportspeople from Wayne County, Michigan
Pan American Wrestling Championships medalists
American male sport wrestlers
20th-century American people
21st-century American people